Jacques Clary Jean Normand (25 November 1848, in Paris – 28 May 1931, in Paris) was a French poet, playwright and writer.

Plays
 Le Troisième larron, 1874, play in 1 act, set to music by Jules Massenet, on the repertoire of the Théâtre de l'Odéon 1875
 L'Amiral, 1880, comédie en deux actes, Théâtre du Gymnase 1880 and Théâtre Français 1895
 Les Petits cadeaux, comédie en un acte, Théâtre du Gymnase
 Les Vieux amis, comédie en trois actes, Théâtre de l'Odéon
 La Douceur de croire, pièce en trois actes, Théâtre Français, 8 July 1899

In collaboration with Arthur Delavigne
 Blakson père et fils, comédie en quatre actes, Théâtre de l'Odéon
 Les petites marmites, comédie en trois actes, Théâtre du Gymnase
 Voilà Monsieur !, comédie en un acte, Théâtre du Gymnase

In collaboration with Guy de Maupassant
 Musette, Théâtre du Gymnase, 1891

References

External links
 
 
 
 

1848 births
Writers from Paris
1931 deaths
École Nationale des Chartes alumni
French male writers
19th-century French dramatists and playwrights
Members of the Ligue de la patrie française
19th-century French male writers